The Diocese of Hólar is a suffragan diocese of the Church of Iceland. The Bishop of Hólar is one of two suffragan bishops to the Bishop of Iceland. The Diocese of Hólar existed between 1106 and 1801 when it was amalgamated into the Diocese of Iceland under the leadership of the Bishop of Iceland. In 1909, the diocese was revived as a titular see of the Church of Iceland.

The following people were bishops of Hólar, Iceland:

Roman Catholic

Former bishopric 
1106–1121:  St. Jón Ögmundsson
1122–1145:  Ketill Þorsteinsson
1147–1162:  Björn Gilsson
1163–1201:  Brandur Sæmundsson
1203–1237:  Guðmundur góði Arason
1238–1247:  Bótólfur
1247–1260:  Heinrekur Kársson
1263–1264:  Brandur Jónsson
1267–1313:  Jörundur Þorsteinsson
1313–1322:  Auðunn rauði Þorbergsson
1324–1331:  Lárentíus Kálfsson
1332–1341:  Egill Eyjólfsson
1342–1356:  Ormr Ásláksson
1358–1390:  Jón skalli Eiríksson
1391–1411:  Pétur Nikulásson
1411–1423:  Jón Henriksson
1425–1435:  Jón Vilhjálmsson
1435–1440:  Jón Bloxwich
1441–1441:  Róbert Wodbor
1442–1457:  Gottskálk Keneksson
1458–1495:  Ólafur Rögnvaldsson
1496–1520:  Gottskálk grimmi Nikulásson
1524–1550:  Jón Arason

Lutheran 
1552–1569:  Ólafur Hjaltason
1571–1627:  Guðbrandur Þorláksson
1628–1656:  Þorlákur Skúlason
1657–1684:  Gísli Þorláksson
1684–1690:  Jón Vigfússon
1692–1696:  Einar Þorsteinsson
1697–1710:  Björn Þorleifsson
1711–1739:  Steinn Jónsson
1741–1745:  Ludvig Harboe
1746–1752:  Halldór Brynjólfsson
1755–1779:  Gísli Magnússon
1780–1781:  Jón Teitsson
1784–1787:  Árni Þórarinsson
1789–1798:  Sigurður Stefánsson

The Diocese was amalgamated in 1801 and now forms part of the Diocese of Reykjavik.

Suffragan bishopric
The see was discontinued from 1801 to 1909. It was revived in 1909 as a suffragan bishopric to the Bishop of Iceland, with the bishop's cathedra in the traditional Hólar cathedral church. In 1990, fresh legislation increased the authority and responsibilities of the Bishop of Hólar as an assistant bishop in the Reykjavik diocese.

1909–1927: Geir Sæmundsson 
1928–1937: Hálfdán Guðjónsson
1937–1959: Friðrik J. Rafnar
1959–1969: Sigurður Stefánsson 
1969–1981: Pétur Sigurgeirsson
1982–1991: Sigurður Guðmundsson 
1991–2002: Bolli Gústavsson 
2003–2012: Jón Aðalsteinn Baldvinsson
2012–present: Solveig Lára Guðmundsdóttir

Sources 
 Sigurdson, Erika Ruth, 'The Church in Fourteenth-Century Iceland: Ecclesiastical Administration, Literacy, and the Formation of an Elite Clerical Identity' (unpublished PhD thesis, University of Leeds, 2011), p. 242, http://etheses.whiterose.ac.uk/2610/  (pre-Reformation bishops).
 Gunnar Kristjánsson et al., eds, Saga biskupsstólanna: Skálholt 950 ára 2006, Hólar 900 ára (Akureyri: Hólar, 2006), pp. 854–55.

References

External links 
 GigaCatholic with incumbent lists and linked biographies

See also 
 List of Skálholt bishops
 Bishop of Iceland

Holar
History of Christianity in Iceland
Holar
Holar
Holar
Holar